Pooja Dhingra (born 198

6) is an Indian pastry chef and businesswoman. She opened India's first macaron store and is the owner of bakery chain Le15 Patisserie that specialises in macarons and a host of French desserts.

Biography
Dhingra was born into a family interested in gastronomy. Both her father and her brother Vaarun Dhingra are restaurant owners. When still young, Dhingra learnt the art of baking from her aunt. She initially enrolled at a law school in Mumbai before quitting in 2004, switching careers to attend a hospitality and management course at the César Ritz school in Le Bouveret, Switzerland. Three years later, she began training at Le Cordon Bleu in Paris. There she came across her first macaron at one of Pierre Hermé's patisseries. After completing her course, Dhingra returned to Mumbai and opened her first store in March 2010 with the single goal of creating Parisian styled culinary experiences in India. In 2016, Dhingra expanded her enterprise, opening a new location called Le15 Café in South Mumbai. While signature desserts named after French women will be featured, the cafe's menu includes simple, savoury food main course dishes.

When she opened her Mumbai business in 2010, she had a staff of only two. By October 2014, she had as many as 42. Her ambition is to open establishments throughout India.

She has been featured in national dailies and is a regular in fashion and lifestyle glossies not just for her abilities in the kitchen, but also as a dynamic businesswoman and inspiration to women - she was selected by Forbes India for their ‘30 Under 30’ achievers list for 2014 and the Forbes 30 under 30 Asia list.

She has published two books, a best seller (in India) on baking. and The Wholesome Kitchen

Bibliography

References

External links 
 
 Le 15
 Pooja Dhingra at Penguin India

Date of birth missing (living people)
Living people
1986 births
21st-century Indian women writers
21st-century Indian writers
Indian chefs
Pastry chefs
Indian food writers
Writers from Mumbai
Alumni of Le Cordon Bleu